Progress M-44, identified by NASA as Progress 3P, was a Progress spacecraft used to resupply the International Space Station. It was a Progress-M 11F615A55 spacecraft, with the serial number 244.

Launch
Progress M-44 was launched by a Soyuz-U carrier rocket from Site 1/5 at the Baikonur Cosmodrome. Launch occurred at 08:09:35 UTC on 26 February 2001. The spacecraft docked with the aft port of the Zvezda module at 09:49:47 UTC on 28 February 2001.

Docking
It remained docked for 47 days before undocking at 08:48 UTC on 16 April 2001. It was deorbited at 13:23 UTC the same day. The spacecraft burned up in the atmosphere over the Pacific Ocean, with any remaining debris landing in the ocean at around 14:11 UTC.

Progress M-44 carried supplies to the International Space Station, including food, water and oxygen for the crew and equipment for conducting scientific research. It was the first Progress-M spacecraft to visit the ISS, previous resupply missions having used the Progress-M1.

See also

 List of Progress flights
 Uncrewed spaceflights to the International Space Station

References

Progress (spacecraft) missions
Supply vehicles for the International Space Station
Spacecraft launched in 2001
Spacecraft which reentered in 2001
Spacecraft launched by Soyuz-U rockets